The Ministry of Defence (Sinhala: රාජ්‍ය ආරක්ෂක අමාත්‍යාංශය Rājya ārakshaka amāthyanshaya; Tamil: பாதுகாப்பு அமைச்சகம்) is the cabinet ministry of the Government of Sri Lanka responsible for implementation of government defence policy and acts as the overall headquarters of the Sri Lankan Armed Forces.

The Ministry of Defence states that its principal objectives are the formulation, co-ordination and the execution of policies in relation to the national security. With the end of the Cold War, the MOD does not foresee any short-term conventional military threat, the main threat to Sri Lanka having been the now-defunct organization, the LTTE and Islamic Terrorism. The Ministry of Defence also manages day-to-day running of the armed forces, contingency planning and defence procurement.

The National Security Council of Sri Lanka is the executive body of the Sri Lankan government that is charged with the maintenance of national security with authority to direct the Sri Lankan military and Police. The Minister of Defence and the Permanent Secretary of the Ministry of Defence and the Chief of the Defence Staff are permanent members of the National Security Council.

History
With Ceylon gaining independence in 1948, the Ministry of External Affairs and Defence was formed to administer the country's armed forces and formulate defence and foreign policy. The Prime Minister was also the Minister of Defence and External Affairs, and was supported by a Parliamentary Secretary for Defence and External Affairs who was a member of Parliament.

In 1977, J.R Jayawardena's government adapted two separate ministries, forming the Ministry of Defence and the Ministry of Foreign Affairs were formed. Since then many presidents retained the portfolio of Minister of Defence under him/her self, except for a few brief periods. In 1999 the National Security Council was established removing the direct control the military from the deputy Minister of Defence.

In 2011, the ministry was renamed Ministry of Defence and Urban Development.

Funding

Senior officials

Minister of Defence – Gotabhaya Rajapaksa
State Minister of Defence - Chamal Rajapaksa
Permanent Secretary – General Kamal Gunaratne 
Chief of the Defence Staff – General Shavendra Silva 
Chief of National Intelligence -

Departments that come under the Ministry of Defence
 Sri Lanka Army
 Sri Lanka Navy
 Sri Lanka Air Force
 State Intelligence Service
 Sri Lanka Coast Guard
 General Sir John Kotelawala Defence University
 Defence Services Command and Staff College
 National Cadet Corps
 Department of Immigration & Emigration
 Department of Registration of Persons
 Department of Civil Defence (formerly the Home Guard Service)
 The National Dangerous Drugs Control Board
 Ranaviru Seva Authority (Veteran's Welfare Authority)
 Centre for Research and Development

Ministers attached to the Ministry of Defence 

Since the establishment of the MoD in 1978 the portfolio of Minister of Defence was held by the President of Sri Lanka, except for a few brief periods . However a minister oversaw activities of the MoD and the armed forces.
Incomplete

Minister of Defence
Tilak Marapana  - Minister of Defence

Minister of State for Defence
Lalith Athulathmudali - Minister of National Security
General Ranjan Wijeratne - Minister of State for Defence
D.B Wijetunga - Minister of State for Defence
Ruwan Wijewardene - State Minister of Defence

Deputy Minister of Defence
Mrvyn Kularatne - Deputy Minister of Defence 
T.B. Werapitiya (former DIG) - Deputy Minister of Defence and Minister of Internal Security
Anura Bastian - Deputy Minister of Defence
General Anuruddha Ratwatte - Deputy Minister of Defence  
Ratnasiri Wickremanayake - Deputy Minister of Defence

Secretaries
Colonel C. A. Dharmapala (1 Sep 1977 — 15 Aug 1983)
General Deshamanya D. S. Attygalle (15 Aug 1983 — 16 Feb 1990)
General Cyril Ranatunga (16 Feb 1990 — 1 May 1993)
Air Chief Marshal Walter Fernando (1 May 1993 — 6 Jun 1993)
General Hamilton Wanasinghe (6 Jun 1993 — 10 Feb 1995)
Chandananda de Silva (7 Dec 1995 — 5 Dec 2001)
Austin Fernando (21 Dec 2001 — 3 Nov 2003)
Cyril Herath (17 Apr 2004 — 30 Nov 2004)
Major General Asoka Jayawardena (1 Dec 2004 — 25 Nov 2005)
Lieutenant Colonel Gotabhaya Rajapaksa (25 Nov 2005 — 9 Jan 2015)
B. M. U. D. Basnayake (11 Jan 2015 — 8 Sep 2015)
Karunasena Hettiarachchi (9 Sep 2015 — 5 Jul 2017)
Kapila Waidyaratne (4 Jul 2017 — 30 October 2018)
Hemasiri Fernando (30 October 2018 - 25 April 2019)
General Shantha Kottegoda (28 April 2019 — 18 November 2019)
General Kamal Gunaratne (18 November 2019 – Incumbent)

See also
 Minister of Defence (Sri Lanka)
 Ministries of Sri Lanka

References

External links 
 Government of Sri Lanka
  Ministry of Defence, Sri Lanka
 Sri Lanka Army
 Sri Lanka Navy
 Sri Lanka Air Force
 General Sir John Kotelawala Defence Academy

Defence agencies of Sri Lanka
Defence
Military of Sri Lanka
Sri Lanka
Ministries established in 1948